A stretcher is a medical device used to carry a person from one place to another.

Stretcher may also refer to:

 Stretcher (furniture), a horizontal support element of an item of furniture
 In brickwork, a brick laid with its long narrow side exposed
 Procrustes or "the stretcher", a smith and bandit in Greek mythology who stretched some of his victims to fit a bed
 "Stretcher" or "The Stretcher", nickname of American professional wrestler Barry Horowitz
 Stretcher (G.I. Joe), a fictional character in the G.I. Joe universe

See also
 Stretcher bar, used by an artist to construct a wooden stretcher frame to mount a canvas
 Stretch (disambiguation)
 Stretching (disambiguation)